Catherine Lefebvre re-directs here. For the curler, see Catherine Lefebvre (curler)

Catherine Hübscher (Goldbach-Altenbach, 2 February 1753 – 1835) was a First French Empire aristocrat, wife to François Joseph Lefebvre, Marshal of the Empire and Duke de Dantzig. 

Known as a woman of modest origins and of strong temperament, she is best known by her nickname of Madame Sans-Gêne, though this was only attributed to her by the dramatist Victorien Sardou - the nickname's first holder was the woman soldier Thérèse Figueur, whom Napoleon I of France gave the nickname Madame Sans-Gêne.

1753 births
1835 deaths
French duchesses
Burials at Père Lachaise Cemetery
People from Haut-Rhin